Perwilty  is a settlement in the administrative district of Gmina Lelkowo, within Braniewo County, Warmian-Masurian Voivodeship, in northern Poland, close to the border with the Kaliningrad Oblast of Russia.

Before 1772 the area was part of Kingdom of Poland, 1772-1945 Prussia and Germany (East Prussia).

References

Perwilty